The fourth season of NCIS: Los Angeles an American police procedural drama television series originally aired on CBS from September 25, 2012, to May 14, 2013. The season was produced by Shane Brennan Productions and CBS Television Studios, with Shane Brennan as showrunner and executive producer. The episodes, "Red" and "Red-2" were intended to be a backdoor pilot for a purposed series titled NCIS: Red associated with the NCIS franchise. However, NCIS: Red was not picked up to series by CBS on May 15, 2013.

Cast and characters

Main
 Chris O'Donnell as G. Callen, NCIS Supervisory Special Agent (SSA) of the Office of Special Projects (O.S.P.) in Los Angeles
 Daniela Ruah as Kensi Blye,  NCIS Junior Field Agent
 Eric Christian Olsen as Marty Deeks, L.A.P.D.Detective And Liaison To NCIS
 Barrett Foa as Eric Beale, NCIS Technical Operator
 Renée Felice Smith as Nell Jones, NCIS Field Agent and Intelligence Analyst
 Linda Hunt as Henrietta Lange, NCIS Supervisory Special Agent(SSA) and Operations Manager
 LL Cool J as Sam Hanna, NCIS Senior Agent, second in command

Recurring
 Kathleen Rose Perkins as Rose Schwartz, coroner in Los Angeles
 Vyto Ruginis as Arkady Kolcheck
 Peter Cambor as Nate Getz, NCIS Special Agent
 Miguel Ferrer as Owen Granger, NCIS Assistant Director
 Erik Palladino as Vostanik Sabatino
 Aunjanue Ellis as Michelle Hanna, "Quinn", Sam's wife
 Christopher Lambert as Marcel Janvier
 Timothy V. Murphy as Isaak Sidorov
 Ravil Isyanov as Anatoli Kirkin
 Alon Abutbul as Naseem Vaziri

Guests
 Kim Raver as Paris Sumerskill, NCIS Special Agent In Charge (SAC) Of the Red Team
 John Corbett as Roy Haines, NCIS Senior Agent and second in command
 Scott Grimes as Dave Flynn, NCIS Forensic Agent
 Gillian Alexy as Clare Keates, NCIS Special Agent
 Edwin Hodge as Kai Ashe, NCIS Tech Expert attached to Red Team

Episodes

Production

Development
NCIS: Los Angeles was renewed for a fourth season on March 14, 2012. In November 2012, NCIS: Los Angeles was introduced in an upcoming spin-off titled NCIS: Red. Written and produced by Shane Brennan, the series would follow "a mobile team of agents who live and work together as they go across the country to solve crimes". The pilot episodes, titled "Red" and "Red-2", which aired on March 19 and March 26, 2013, during the fourth season of the series. On May 15, 2013, it was announced that NCIS: Red would not be picked up to series by CBS.

Broadcast
Season four of NCIS: Los Angeles premiered on September 25, 2012.

Reception

Ratings

Home video release

References

General

External links
 
 

2012 American television seasons
2013 American television seasons
04